Saletan is a surname. Notable people with the surname include:

 Tony Saletan (born 1931), American folk singer and music educator
 William Saletan, American columnist